"Gerald" Hylkema (February 14, 1946 – March 26, 2002) was a Dutch professional football forward who played three games in the North American Soccer League and several seasons in the American Soccer League.

Hylkema began his athletic career in field hockey. In 1968, he was part of the Dutch field hockey team at the 1968 Summer Olympics. In 1970, he turned to professional soccer when he signed with FC Groningen but he spent his first season with the reserves. In 1971, Hylkema gained promotion to the first team where he saw limited time over two seasons. He then played for Atlante F.C. in Mexico. In 1975, Hylkema played three games for the San Antonio Thunder of the North American Soccer League. In 1976, he played for the Oakland Buccaneers of the American Soccer League. In 1977 and 1978, he played for the Sacramento Gold. In 1980, the Golden Gate Gales selected Hylkema in the ASL Dispersal Draft. After he retired from playing professionally, Hytlkema settled in the San Francisco Bay area where he coached.

In the 1984/1985 season, he coached the soccer team of the California State University in Sacramento.

References

External links
 
NASL stats
sports-reference.com

1950 births
2002 deaths
Footballers from Groningen (city)
Association football forwards
Dutch footballers
Dutch expatriate footballers
Dutch male field hockey players
Field hockey players at the 1968 Summer Olympics
Olympic field hockey players of the Netherlands
FC Groningen players
Eredivisie players
American Soccer League (1933–1983) players
North American Soccer League (1968–1984) players
Liga MX players
Atlante F.C. footballers
San Antonio Thunder players
Oakland Buccaneers players
Sacramento Gold (1976–1980) players
Golden Gate Gales players
Expatriate footballers in Mexico
Dutch expatriate sportspeople in Mexico
Expatriate soccer players in the United States
Dutch expatriate sportspeople in the United States
Sportspeople from Groningen (city)

2013 Sacramento State Men's Soccer Media Guide